is a Japanese seinen manga magazine published by Futabasha. It is currently published twice a month, on the first and third Thursday. It is considered the first true seinen magazine. In 2003 it changed to its current publishing format and dropped the Weekly part of its name to reflect its new schedule.

Circulation numbers between October 2009 and September 2010 was 200,000.

Manga titles

Currently serialized
Listed alphabetically.
Bar Lemon Heart (since 1986, Mitsutoshi Furuya)
Ganpapatō no Zerosen Shōjo (since 2007, Sōichi Moto)
Koroshiya-san: The Hired Gun (since 2004, Tamachiku)
Mitsubachi no Kiss (since 2008, Tōru Izu)
My Pure Lady: Onegai Suppleman (since 2006, Kaoru Hazuki (artist), Chinatsu Tomisawa (creator))
The New Dinosaurs: An Alternative Evolution (since ?, Takaaki Ogawa (artist), Dougal Dixon (writer))
Ninja Papa (since 2006, Yasuhito Yamamoto)
Nōnai Kakutō Akiba Shoot (since 2007, Shingo Yamada)
Ōsaka Hamlet (since 2005, Hiromi Morishita)
Porno Graffiti (since 2008, Chinatsu Tomisawa)
Samayoi Zakura (since 2008, Mamora Gōda)
Sensei no Kaban (since 1999, Jiro Taniguchi (artist), Hiromi Kawakami (creator))
Shin Shiawase no Jikan (since 2005, Yasuyumi Kunitomo)
Suzuki-sensei (since 2005, Kenji Taketomi)
Uchi no Tsumatte Dō Deshō? (since 2007, Shigeyuki Fukumitsu)
Wild Nights (since 2008, Tomohiro Koizumi)

Previously serialized
Listed by order of appearance.
009-1  (1967-1970, Shotaro Ishinomori)
Lupin III  (1967-1972, Monkey Punch)
Lone Wolf and Cub  (1970-1976, Kazuo Koike, Goseki Kojima)
Ganbare!! Tabuchi-kun!! (1978-1979, Hisaichi Ishii)
Jarinko Chie (1978-1997, Etsumi Haruki)
Judge (1989-1991, Fujihiko Hosono)
All Purpose Cultural Cat Girl Nuku Nuku (1990-1991, Yuzo Takada)
Crayon Shin-chan (1990-2000, Yoshito Usui)
Old Boy  (1996-1998, Garon Tsuchiya & Nobuaki Minegishi)
Shiawase no Jikan (1997-2001, Yasuyuki Kunitomo)
Shamo (1998-2007, Izo Hashimoto & Akio Tanaka)
High School Girls  (2001-2004, Towa Oshima)
Cutie Honey Tennyo Densetsu (2001-2003, Go Nagai)
Sky Hawk (2002, Jiro Taniguchi)
Town of Evening Calm, Country of Cherry Blossoms  (2003, Fumiyo Kōno)
Maestro (2003-2007, Akira Sasō)
Kodomo no Kodomo (2004, Akira Sasō)
17-sai.
Ochiken (2005-2008, Yoshio Kawashima)
Ekiben Hitoritabi (since 2006–2011, Jun Hayase (art & story), Kan Sakurai (editor))
Hinotama Love (2006-2007, Maya Koikeda)
Gokudō Meshi (2006-2013, Shigeru Tsuchiyama)
Crime and Punishment: A Falsified Romance (January 23, 2007 – March 15, 2011, Naoyuki Ochiai)
In This Corner of the World (2006-2009, Fumiyo Kōno)
Stargazing Dog (August 5, 2008 – February 3, 2009, Takashi Murakami)
Drifting Net Cafe (February 28, 2009 – June 28, 2011, Shūzō Oshimi)
Fujiyama-san wa Shishunki (November 2012 - December 2015, Makoto Ojiro)
Inside Mari (March 2012 - September 2016, Shūzō Oshimi)
Tomodachi x Monster (June 2014 – 27 June 2015, Yoshihiko Inui)

References

External links
  

Manga Action
Seinen manga magazines
Magazines established in 1967
1967 establishments in Japan
Futabasha
Biweekly magazines published in Japan